{{Infobox person
| name               = Huw Edwards
| image              = HuwEdwardsNightingale.JPG
| image_size         = 
| alt                = Huw Edwards
| caption            = Edwards in 2013
| birth_name         = 
| birth_date         = 
| birth_place        = Bridgend, Glamorgan, Wales
| death_date         = 
| death_place        = 
| death_cause        = 
| education          = Llanelli Boys' Grammar School
| alma_mater         = Cardiff University (BA)University of Wales Trinity Saint David (PhD)
| occupation         = Journalist, newsreader, television presenter
| years_active       = 1984–present
| employer           = BBC
| known_for          = Olympic GamesBBC News at TenBBC News at SixBBC News ChannelBBC News at Five2011 Royal Wedding2015 UK general election2017 UK general election2018 Royal Wedding2019 UK general electionRoyal British Legion Festival of RemembranceFuneral of Prince PhilipAnnouncing the Death of Queen Elizabeth IIFuneral of Queen Elizabeth II| title              = Chief Presenter, BBC News
| spouse             = Vicky Flind
| children           = 5
| parents            = Hywel Teifi Edwards (father)Aerona Protheroe (mother)
}}

Huw Edwards (born 18 August 1961) is a Welsh journalist, presenter, and newsreader. Edwards presents BBC News at Ten, the corporation's flagship news broadcast.

Edwards also presents BBC coverage of state events, international events, the hour-long BBC News at Five on the BBC's rolling news channel BBC News and occasionally presents either as relief or as the BBC's chief presenter BBC News at Six, BBC News at One, BBC Weekend News and Daily Politics, as well as on the BBC's international news channel BBC World News. Edwards presented the BBC's coverage of major royal events, including the wedding of Prince William and Catherine Middleton, the Diamond Jubilee of Elizabeth II, the wedding of Prince Harry and Meghan Markle, the funeral of Prince Philip, Duke of Edinburgh, and the death and state funeral of Elizabeth II.

Edwards succeeded David Dimbleby as the host of BBC election night coverage and was the lead presenter for the 2019 general election coverage on 12 and 13 December.

Early life and education
Huw Edwards was born on 18 August 1961 in Bridgend, Glamorgan, Wales,  into a Welsh-speaking family, and, from the age of four, was brought up in Llangennech, near Llanelli. His father, Hywel Teifi Edwards, was a Plaid Cymru and Welsh language activist, and an author and academic, who was Research Professor of Welsh-language Literature at University College, Swansea. Edwards' mother, Aerona Protheroe, taught at Llanelli's Ysgol Gyfun y Strade for 30 years. He has one sister, Meinir. He was educated at Llanelli Boys' Grammar School and graduated with a first-class honours degree in French from University College, Cardiff, in 1983. After his first degree, he started postgraduate work at Cardiff University in Medieval French, before becoming a reporter for local radio station Swansea Sound and then joining the BBC.

Career

BBC News
Edwards spent a short time on work experience at the commercial radio station Swansea Sound, before joining the BBC as a news trainee in 1984. In 1986 he became Parliamentary Correspondent for BBC Wales.

Between 1994 and January 2003, Edwards presented the BBC Six O'Clock News. During this period, this was the most watched news programme in Britain.

In January 2003, Edwards became the main presenter of the Ten O'Clock News on BBC One, the corporation's flagship news broadcast. Along with David Dimbleby, he also presents various special programmes such as the Festival of Remembrance, Trooping the Colour and the State Opening of Parliament. He led the BBC commentary team at the opening and closing ceremonies of the 2008 Beijing Olympics, 2012 London Olympics and 2014 Commonwealth Games. He has presented several election specials, including coverage of the 2007 National Assembly for Wales election for BBC Wales and also the BBC coverage of the United States elections, 2008 results and the inauguration of Barack Obama. He was formerly Chief Political Correspondent for BBC News, and spent more than 14 years reporting politics from Westminster across a range of BBC programmes.

Edwards has also presented or contributed to a range of other BBC News programmes, including Breakfast News, One O'Clock News, Newsnight and Panorama. Since April 2006, Edwards has presented the newly established BBC News at Five on the 24-hour BBC News channel. On 29 April 2011 he presented the BBC coverage of the Wedding of Prince William and Catherine Middleton. The coverage was watched by 20 million viewers at peak in the United Kingdom and the team won a BAFTA Award for Best Coverage of a Live Event. In June 2012 he presented the BBC coverage of the Diamond Jubilee of Elizabeth II. In December 2013 he led the first few hours of BBC News coverage of the death of Nelson Mandela on BBC One, BBC News Channel and BBC World News. In 2014 Edwards presented BBC Local Elections taking over coverage from David Dimbleby.

Edwards shared the BBC's 2015 general election and 2016 EU referendum coverage with Dimbleby. In May 2018 he shared the presentation of the BBC coverage of the wedding of Prince Harry and Meghan Markle. In April 2021, he presented the rolling coverage across BBC One, BBC Two, BBC News Channel and BBC World News following the death of Prince Philip, as well as funeral coverage on the 17 April.

In August 2021 Edwards admitted that he was contemplating his future. "Now that a big milestone is here, which is 60-years-old, it's natural for a man to think 'Am I going to continue in this job for another five years, or do I want to do something different?'", he told BBC Radio Cymru. "The nightly news business, after 20 years, that can be taxing, even though I still enjoy the job. But I don't think I'll be doing that for long. Because I believe that, in the first place, I think it's fair for the viewers to get a change."

On 8 September 2022, he announced the death of Queen Elizabeth II, presenting rolling news coverage from around 14:00 BST following an announcement from Buckingham Palace earlier in the day. He later presented the BBC's coverage of the Queen's funeral on 19 September.

Other programming and appearances
Although predominantly a news journalist, Edwards has presented a wide range of programming on television and radio, including documentaries on classical music, religion and the Welsh language, of which he is a native speaker, and hosted various events such as the BAFTA Cymru award ceremonies. He has a particular interest in history and has presented documentaries on many historical subjects, including Owain Glyndŵr, the South Wales Valleys, Gladstone and Disraeli and a series following the work of the Royal Commission on the Ancient and Historical Monuments of Wales.

He presented Bread of Heaven with Huw Edwards, a documentary about the impact of religion in Wales which won the 2005 BAFTA Cymru for best documentary and nominations in four other categories.

In September 2008, the BBC Trust ruled that a documentary presented by Edwards on the subject of Welsh politics had broken the organisation's editorial guidelines. The programme, entitled Wales: Power and the People – Back to the Future, addressed the topic of the Welsh Assembly, with Edwards stating, "to achieve its full potential it needs even greater support for the people of Wales than it's received so far ...  the more people that take part, the stronger and healthier our democracy in Wales will be." Following a complaint, the governing body concluded that Edwards' words were not objective and even-handed on the subject stating' "it is not the role of BBC presenters to encourage audiences to exercise their right to vote on particular occasions." It was also found that the documentary as a whole was biased against the Conservative Party.

In 2010 Edwards presented a programme titled The Prince and the Plotter about the Investiture of the Prince of Wales, and the part played by Mudiad Amddiffyn Cymru, receiving the "Best on Screen presenter" at the BAFTA Cymru Awards for his work.

In February 2012 he launched a historical documentary series made by BBC Wales, entitled The Story of Wales. Also in 2012, Edwards appeared as himself in a cameo role in the 23rd James Bond film Skyfall, presenting a BBC News report on a fictionalised attack on the British intelligence service MI6.

In 2015 he presented a history of the Welsh colony in Patagoniain English and Welsh versionsto celebrate the 150th anniversary of the colony's establishment.

In December 2018 Edwards was a guest of Mary Berry in BBC One's Mary Berry's Christmas Party.

In December 2022 Edwards was the narrator for the BBC Four programme Organ Stops: Saving the King of Instruments.

Other activities
In March 2011 Edwards opened Swansea University's "Hoffi Coffi" cafe in the library, created to support the aims of Academi Hywel Teifi, named after his father who spent his academic career at the university. He gave a speech in Welsh as he unveiled a wall mural of a poem by Tudur Hallam, Professor of Welsh at the university and chair of the previous year's Eisteddfod, saying it was a moving tribute to his father, who had died in January 2010.

In 2003 Edwards was made a Fellow of the University of Wales and in 2007 became Honorary Professor of Journalism at Cardiff University. In 2005 he was appointed Patron of the National College of Music and in October 2008 he was appointed President of the London Welsh Trust which runs the London Welsh Centre. In April 2009 he was elected Vice President, later Pro Chancellor, of Cardiff University for four years. He was honorary President of London's Gwalia Male Choir from 2005–2016, and is a vice president of the National Churches Trust.

Edwards has been critical of some England-based newspapers for printing stories dismissive of the use of the Welsh language. In 2020 he responded to comments in The Times written by scientist Michael Pepper in which it was suggested that his late colleague John Meurig Thomas wrote notes in Welsh purely to stop others from reading them; Edwards pointed out that Welsh speakers do not "use our native language in our daily lives simply to thwart others". In 2021 he criticised former journalist Max Hastings for claiming that the Welsh language was of "marginal value" and that Wales could not succeed as an independent country because it was "dependent on English largesse".

On 5 July 2019 Edwards was awarded a Fellowship of the Royal Welsh College of Music & Drama. In 2022, he was appointed a Vice-President of The Bach Choir.

He is also an amateur organist, taught to play at a chapel in Llanelli, and occasionally plays at the Jewin Welsh Presbyterian Chapel in Clerkenwell, north London.

BBC Salary
He earned £550,000 – £599,999 as a BBC presenter for several years. His salary was reduced voluntarily in the light of gender pay differences found within the BBC. Press Gazette announced his new salary to be £520,000 – £529,999 as of July 2018. His salary was further reduced in 2019, with his salary as of May 2021 was reported to be £465,000.

Personal life
Edwards is married to Vicky Flind, a television producer, whose credits include editing This Week and Peston. The couple live in Dulwich, London, and have five children. Edwards is an active Christian and is a weekly churchgoer. Edwards was awarded a PhD, on Welsh Chapels in London and Llanelli, by the University of Wales Trinity Saint David in 2018.
He has stated that he has had bouts of depression since 2002.

Awards

Bibliography
 2009, Capeli Llanelli: Our Rich Heritage, Carmarthenshire County Council, 
 2014, City Mission – the Story of London's Welsh Chapels'',  Y Lolfa, Tal-y-bont,

References

External links

 Hon. President Llanelli Community Heritage
 
 Huw Edwards Profile TV Newsroom

News items
 Times February 2009
 Guardian interview January 2003
 Huw's rise to the top in September 2002

1961 births
Living people
People from Bridgend
Alumni of Cardiff University
Welsh television journalists
BBC newsreaders and journalists
Classical music radio presenters
People educated at Llanelli Boys' Grammar School
BBC television presenters
BBC radio presenters
BBC World News
Welsh-speaking journalists